Vladimír Resl (born 3 March 1953) was a Czechoslovakian luger who competed in the late 1970s and early 1980s. He won the bronze medal in the men's doubles event at the 1978 FIL European Luge Championships in Hammarstrand, Sweden.

Resl also finished eighth in the men's doubles event at the 1980 Winter Olympics in Lake Placid, New York.

References

External links
 1980 Winter Olympic men's doubles results.
 List of European luge champions 

Czechoslovak male lugers
Olympic lugers of Czechoslovakia
Lugers at the 1976 Winter Olympics
Lugers at the 1980 Winter Olympics
1953 births
Living people